Sulice is a municipality and village in Prague-East District in the Central Bohemian Region of the Czech Republic. It has about 2,300 inhabitants.

Administrative parts
Villages of Hlubočinka, Nechánice and Želivec are administrative parts of Sulice.

History
The first written mention of Sulice is from 1282, of Nechánice from 1349 and of Želivec from 1402.

Gallery

References

Villages in Prague-East District